In enzymology, a methylenetetrahydrofolate dehydrogenase (NADP+) is an enzyme that catalyzes the chemical reaction

5,10-methylenetetrahydrofolate + NADP+  5,10-methenyltetrahydrofolate + NADPH + H+

Thus, the two substrates of this enzyme are 5,10-methylenetetrahydrofolate and NADP+, whereas its 3 products are 5,10-methenyltetrahydrofolate, NADPH, and H+.

This enzyme belongs to the family of oxidoreductases, specifically those acting on the CH-NH group of donors with NAD+ or NADP+ as acceptor.  This enzyme participates in glyoxylate and dicarboxylate metabolism and one carbon pool by folate.

Structural studies

Clinical significance  

Mutations of the MTHFD1 gene may disrupt the activity of the enzyme and cause methylenetetrahydrofolate dehydrogenase 1 deficiency, also known as combined immunodeficiency and megaloblastic anemia with or without hyperhomocysteinemia (CIMAH).

Alternative names 
The systematic name of this enzyme class is 5,10-methylenetetrahydrofolate:NADP+ oxidoreductase. Other names in common use include N5,N10-methylenetetrahydrofolate dehydrogenase, 5,10-methylenetetrahydrofolate:NADP oxidoreductase, 5,10-methylenetetrahydrofolate dehydrogenase, methylenetetrahydrofolate dehydrogenase, and methylenetetrahydrofolate dehydrogenase (NADP).

References

 
 
 
 

EC 1.5.1
NADPH-dependent enzymes
Enzymes of known structure